Megeugynothrips is a monotypic genus of thrips in the family Phlaeothripidae.

Species
 Megeugynothrips efflatouni

References

Phlaeothripidae
Thrips
Thrips genera
Monotypic insect genera